Les Sampou (born November 4, 1961) is an American singer-songwriter and recording artist. She was born in Norwalk, Connecticut, United States.  Sampou has toured nationally since the 1990s, performing at stages such as Montreal Jazz Festival, Philadelphia Folk Festival, and the Toronto Blues Festival.  She has recorded six albums for Rounder Records and as an indie artist. Sampou is known for her "diverse song styles, smart lyrics, and hook-laden melodies." (The Boston Globe)

Sampou's Borrowed & Blue album recorded in 2001, is a collection of country blues classics recorded live by songwriter JP Jones, featuring Sampou on guitar and vocals. It received critical acclaim from critics like Roberta Schwartz of Peterborough Folk Music Society, who highlighted how the album showcased blues can be reached to a younger audience.

In 2010, Sampou released an Americana-themed recording called Lonesomeville, charting at number two in the radio FAR Charts, accompanied by a series of concert shows in traditional folk venues, such as Passim, in Cambridge, Massachusetts, and additional Boston area venues in cooperation with local musicians Taylor Amerding, Mark Cunningham, Andy Plaisted, Kevin Barry, Mike Dinallo and Jimmy Ryan.

In 2015, Sampou wrote for television and film projects, and toured in New England. She released her sixth album, Live at Church, a dedication album to the national coffeehouse circuit of volunteers and promoters who present on church stages.

Discography
 Sweet Perfume (1993)
 Fall From Grace (1996)
 Les Sampou (1999)
 Borrowed & Blue (2001)
 Lonesomeville (2010)
 Live at Church (2015)

References

External links
 Current home page of Les Sampou

1961 births
Living people
American women singer-songwriters
American blues singers
American blues guitarists
American women guitarists
American folk musicians
Musicians from Norwalk, Connecticut
21st-century American women
Singer-songwriters from Connecticut